Manganese(II) chloride is the dichloride salt of manganese, MnCl2. This inorganic chemical exists in the anhydrous form, as well as the dihydrate (MnCl2·2H2O) and tetrahydrate (MnCl2·4H2O), with the tetrahydrate being the most common form. Like many Mn(II) species, these salts are pink, with the paleness of the color being characteristic of transition metal complexes with high spin d5 configurations.

Preparation
Manganese chloride is produced by treating manganese(IV) oxide with concentrated hydrochloric acid.
MnO2  +  4 HCl   →   MnCl2  +  2 H2O  +  Cl2
This reaction was once used for the manufacture of chlorine.  By carefully neutralizing the resulting solution with MnCO3, one can selectively precipitate iron salts, which are common impurities in manganese dioxide.

In the laboratory, manganese chloride can be prepared by treating manganese metal or manganese(II) carbonate with hydrochloric acid:
Mn  +  2 HCl +  4 H2O   →  MnCl2(H2O)4  +  H2
MnCO3  +  2 HCl  +  3 H2O  →   MnCl2(H2O)4  + CO2

Structures
Anhydrous MnCl2 adopts a layered cadmium chloride-like structure. The tetrahydrate consists of octahedral cis-Mn(H2O)4Cl2 molecules.  The trans isomer, which is metastable, is also known.  The dihydrate MnCl2(H2O)2 is a coordination polymer.  Each Mn center is coordinated to four doubly bridging chloride ligands.  The octahedron is completed by a pair of mutually trans aquo ligands.

Chemical properties
The hydrates dissolve in water to give mildly acidic solutions with a pH of around 4.  These solutions consist of the metal aquo complex [Mn(H2O)6]2+.

It is a weak Lewis acid, reacting with chloride ions to produce a series of salts containing the following ions [MnCl3]−, [MnCl4]2−, and [MnCl6]4−.  

Upon treatment with typical organic ligands, manganese(II) undergoes oxidation by air to give Mn(III)  complexes.  Examples include [Mn(EDTA)]−, [Mn(CN)6]3−, and [Mn(acetylacetonate)3].  Triphenylphosphine forms a labile 2:1 adduct:
MnCl2  +  2 Ph3P  →  [MnCl2(Ph3P)2]

Anhydrous manganese(II) chloride serves as a starting point for the synthesis of a variety of organomanganese compounds.  For example, manganocene is prepared by reaction of MnCl2 with a solution of sodium cyclopentadienide in tetrahydrofuran (THF).
MnCl2  +  2 NaC5H5  →  Mn(C5H5)2  +  2 NaCl
Similar reactions are used in the preparation of the antiknock compound methylcyclopentadienyl manganese tricarbonyl.

Manganese chloride is a precursor to organomanganese reagents in organic chemistry.

Manganese chloride is mainly used in the production of dry cell batteries.

Magnetism
Manganese(II) salts are paramagnetic. As such the presence of such salts profoundly affect NMR spectra.

Natural occurrence
Scacchite is the natural, anhydrous form of manganese(II) chloride.

Precautions
Manganism, or manganese poisoning, can be caused by long-term exposure to manganese dust or fumes.

References

External links

National Pollutant Inventory: Manganese and compounds Fact Sheet

Chlorides
Manganese(II) compounds
Metal halides